The 1st IAAF World Cup in Athletics was an international track and field sporting event sponsored by the International Association of Athletics Federations, held from 2 to 4 September 1977, at the Rheinstadion in Düsseldorf, West Germany.

Overall results

Medal summary

Men

Women

1 Ilona Schoknecht of East Germany originally won the shot put with 20.93m, but she was disqualified after it was found that she had failed a doping test at the European Cup.

External links
World Cup Results
Full Results by IAAF

IAAF Continental Cup
World Cup
IAAF World Cup
International athletics competitions hosted by West Germany